Shahrak-e Taleqani (also Romanized as Shahrak-e Ţāleqānī) is a village in Veys Rural District, Veys District, Bavi County, Khuzestan Province, Iran. At the 2006 census, its population was 2,298, in 373 families.

References 

Populated places in Bavi County